Xymon Ezekiel Nulos Pineda (born October 1, 2010), popularly known as Onyok Pineda or simply Onyok, is a Filipino child actor. He came to prominence in 2014 when he joined a segment in the variety show It's Showtime. His acting career started when he played Onyok in the 2015 action drama television series Ang Probinsyano; a role in which he would briefly reprise in the series' final episode in August 2022. Pineda made his film debut in a supporting role in the action-comedy The Super Parental Guardians (2016). His other film appearances are in the romantic comedy Loving in Tandem (2017), and Ang Panday (2017).

Life and career 
Xymon Ezekiel Nulos Pineda was born on October 1, 2010, in Bacoor, Cavite.

Pineda came to fame when he joined a segment called "Mini-Me" in the variety show It's Showtime and made a young impersonation of the Filipino singer Bamboo. Pineda started his acting career in Ang Probinsyano as Onyok the adoptive son of Cardo. Pineda is one of the cast in The Super Parental Guardians as Ernie Gaspar, a brother of Megan Gaspar role of Awra Briguela.

Filmography

Film

Television

Awards and nominations

See also 
 Awra Briguela
 Coco Martin
 Vice Ganda

References

External links

2010 births
Living people
21st-century Filipino male actors
Filipino male child actors
Star Magic
ABS-CBN personalities